Miracle at Philadelphia: The Story of the Constitutional Convention is a work of historical non-fiction, written by Catherine Drinker Bowen and originally published in 1966. Bowen recounts the Philadelphia Convention, a meeting in 1787 that created the United States Constitution. Bowen draws much of her information from notes and journals of the Framers, especially James Madison. It contains vivid description of many founders including George Washington, Benjamin Franklin, James Madison, Alexander Hamilton, George Mason, and Gouverneur Morris, important compromises such as the Great Compromise, and controversial issues such as slavery.

External links
Review on Harvard Law Review
Amazon.com entry
Politix Review

1966 non-fiction books
Little, Brown and Company books
Constitution of the United States
History books about the United States
Books about Pennsylvania